Jürgen Rollmann (born 17 October 1966) is a German former professional footballer who played as a goalkeeper.

The most notable game of his career was the victorious 1992 European Cup Winners' Cup Final for Werder Bremen, which he played instead of Oliver Reck who was suspended.

References

External links

1966 births
Living people
German footballers
Association football goalkeepers
Kickers Offenbach players
TSV 1860 Munich players
FSV Frankfurt players
SV Werder Bremen players
SV Werder Bremen II players
MSV Duisburg players
FC Augsburg players
Bundesliga players
2. Bundesliga players
People from Gelnhausen
Sportspeople from Darmstadt (region)
Footballers from Hesse
West German footballers